Penagar is an Indian Panchayat village located in Gingee taluk of Viluppuram district in the state of Tamil Nadu, India. According to the 2001 census, the village had a population of 2071, with a literacy rate of 59%.

References 

Villages in Viluppuram district